Rufin Molomadan (born 22 July 1967) is a former cyclist from the Central African Republic. He competed in the team time trial at the 1992 Summer Olympics.

References

1967 births
Living people
Central African Republic male cyclists
Olympic cyclists of the Central African Republic
Cyclists at the 1992 Summer Olympics
Place of birth missing (living people)